The 1992 Winter Olympic games cross-country skiing results. The cross-country skiing competitions were held at Les Saisies, about 40 km from the host city Albertville.

Evolution of the Olympic program
The combined pursuit was added in substitute of the men's 15 km and women's 10 km. Women's 30 km replaced the 20 km event.

Medal summary

Medal table

Participant NOCs
Forty nations sent ski runners to compete in the events.

Men's events

Women's events

See also
 Cross-country skiing at the 1992 Winter Paralympics

References

External links
 Official Olympic Report

 
1992 Winter Olympics
1992 Winter Olympics events
Olympics
Cross-country skiing competitions in France